General elections were held in Singapore on 23 December 1980. The result was a victory for the People's Action Party, which won all 75 seats, the last of four consecutive elections in which they repeated the feat. Voter turnout was 95.5%, although this figure represents the turnout in the 38 constituencies to be contested, with PAP candidates earning walkovers in the other 37. 685,141 voters out of the total electorate of 1,290,426 went to vote on the elections.

Background
Prior to this election, a series of by-elections were held in 1977 and 1979 after two and seven MPs, respectively, were vacated; however, the ruling PAP won every seat, allowing nine new candidates, which include Devan Nair and Tony Tan (both would later go on to become Presidents of Singapore) to enter Parliament. During the election, PAP also introduced a few other prominent members, such as future ministers Lee Yock Suan and S. Jayakumar, as well as a backbencher (and later Progress Singapore Party secretary-general and a 2011 presidential candidate) Tan Cheng Bock.

On 2 April the following year, then-President of National Trades Union Congress, Phey Yew Kok, resigned his Boon Teck seat after Phey was initially charged from a funding fraud of trade union funds, and left Singapore to avoid a bail; however, Lee chose not to call a by-election in his place since the current Parliament term was due to end.

Timeline

Campaign
The school streaming system, as well as Phey's fraud, became highlights of the campaign for the election. 

Independent candidate Chiam See Tong, who made his political debut in the previous election, founded Singapore Democratic Party on 8 September, and would later go on to win Potong Pasir Constituency on the 1984 election on his third attempt (his first attempt was in the by-election last year) after the retirement of incumbent and cabinet minister Howe Yoon Chong. 

A total of 43 opposition candidates went on to contest in 38 constituencies, which was nearly half of the total, with United People's Front representing the most number of candidates at 14. This was the first election (of the only three in history, with the other being 2006 and 2011) none of the candidates run as Independents.

Constituencies

Similar to previous elections, constituencies were either dissolved or created due to population. The constituencies which saw changes were:

Results

By constituency

Notes

References

Singapore
General elections in Singapore
1980 in Singapore